Dover Township may be any of these places in the U.S. state of Ohio:

 Dover Township, Athens County, Ohio
 Dover Township, Cuyahoga County, Ohio, a defunct township
 Dover Township, Fulton County, Ohio
 Dover Township, Tuscarawas County, Ohio
 Dover Township, Union County, Ohio

See also
 Dover Township (disambiguation)

Ohio township disambiguation pages